The name Basyang has been used in the Philippines by PAGASA in the Western Pacific.
 Typhoon Mitag (2002) (T0202, 02W, Basyang) – affected Micronesia, killing one person and causing $150 million in damages
 Tropical Depression Basyang (2006) (01W) – a tropical depression that was only recognized by PAGASA and JTWC
 Typhoon Conson (2010) (T1002, 03W, Basyang) – a poorly-forecasted minimal typhoon which caused destruction in the Philippines
 Tropical Storm Kajiki (2014) (T1402, 02W, Basyang) – an early January tropical storm.
 Tropical Storm Sanba (2018) (T1802, 02W, Basyang) – a minimal tropical storm which affected southern Philippines in February 2018
 Typhoon Malakas (2022) (T2201, 02W, Basyang) - the first named storm and typhoon of the 2022 season

A variation of the name, Basiang, was also used by PAGASA for three tropical cyclones:
 Typhoon Tilda (1964) (T6419, 29W, Basiang) – a relatively strong typhoon which brushed Taiwan, northern Philippines and southern China before eventually making landfall in Vietnam
 Tropical Storm Opal (1976) (T7625, 26W, Basiang) – a minimal tropical storm which stayed at sea
 Tropical Depression Basiang (1980) – a tropical depression that was only recognized by PAGASA and JMA

Pacific typhoon set index articles